Józefin may refer to the following places:
Józefin, Gmina Chełm in Lublin Voivodeship (east Poland)
Józefin, Gmina Kamień in Lublin Voivodeship (east Poland)
Józefin, Gmina Rejowiec Fabryczny in Lublin Voivodeship (east Poland)
Józefin, Hrubieszów County in Lublin Voivodeship (east Poland)
Józefin, Gmina Urzędów in Lublin Voivodeship (east Poland)
Józefin, Gmina Zakrzówek in Lublin Voivodeship (east Poland)
Józefin, Podlaskie Voivodeship (north-east Poland)
Józefin, Bielsk County in Podlaskie Voivodeship (north-east Poland)
Józefin, Gmina Ujazd in Łódź Voivodeship (central Poland)
Józefin, Gmina Żelechlinek in Łódź Voivodeship (central Poland)
Józefin, Gmina Halinów in Masovian Voivodeship (east-central Poland)
Józefin, Gmina Jakubów in Masovian Voivodeship (east-central Poland)
Józefin, Gmina Korczew in Masovian Voivodeship (east-central Poland)
Józefin, Gmina Kotuń in Masovian Voivodeship (east-central Poland)
Józefin, Wołomin County in Masovian Voivodeship (east-central Poland)
Józefin, Greater Poland Voivodeship (west-central Poland)
Józefin, West Pomeranian Voivodeship (north-west Poland)